Warrenville is a census-designated place (CDP) in Aiken County, South Carolina, United States. The population was 1,233 at the 2010 census. It is located just south of Graniteville and is part of the Augusta, Georgia metropolitan area. Warrenville is located in historic Horse Creek Valley.

History
In 2008, there were talks about incorporating the villages of Warrenville, Graniteville, and Vaucluse; as a result, the towns approved a referendum to vote on whether or not to incorporate. The referendum was defeated by a two-to-one margin in August 2008.

The Warrenville Elementary School was listed on the National Register of Historic Places in 2002.

Demographics

The Demographics of the CDP as of 2010 were as follows:	Counts	Percentages
Total Population 1,233	100.00%
 
Population by Race:
American Indian and Alaska native alone	11 (0.89%)
Asian alone 3	(0.24%)
Black or African American alone 66 (5.35%)
Native Hawaiian and Other Pacific native alone 0 (0.0%)
Some other race alone	50 (4.06%)
Two or more races	45 (3.65%)
White alone	1,058   (85.81%)
 
Population by Hispanic or Latino Origin: (of any race)
Persons of Hispanic or Latino Origin	84  (6.81%)
Persons Not of Hispanic or Latino Origin   1,149 (93.19%)
 
Population by Gender
Male	580	(47.04%)
Female	653	(52.96%)
 
Population by Age
Persons 0 to 4 years	65	(5.27%)
Persons 5 to 17 years	205	(16.63%)
Persons 18 to 64 years	732	(59.37%)
Persons 65 years and over	231 (18.73%)

Education
Warrenville has a public library, a branch of the ABBE Regional Library System.

References 

Census-designated places in South Carolina
Census-designated places in Aiken County, South Carolina
Augusta metropolitan area